COP Compilation is a various artists compilation album released on January 20, 1997 by COP International.

Reception

AllMusic gave COP Compilation a rating of three out of five stars, saying "the majority of these cuts are prime industrial", crediting the tracks by Deathline International and Slave Unit as the album's highlights, "with only a few mediocre offerings from Index, Heavy Water Unit and Battery." Black Monday criticized the release for not representing the musical quality of COP International and said "if your not familiar with the label, or the musicians, this is a safe buy; you'll be enchanted by the unique feel and integrity of the COP clan of musicians." Sonic Boom called the album "an excellent compilation for both a first time COP purchaser and for completest's as they can either sample the entire label on this single release or collect all the track found only here." The album peaked at number twenty-five on CMJ New Music Monthly's top dance releases in 1997.

Track listing

Accolades

Personnel
Adapted from the COP Compilation liner notes.

 Kim Hansen (as Kim X) – compiling
 Evan Sornstein (Curium Design) – cover art, photography
 Christian Petke (as Count Zero) – compiling
 Stefan Vardopoulos – mastering

Release history

References

External links 
 COP Compilation at Discogs (list of releases)

1997 compilation albums
COP International compilation albums